Neil Z. Auerbach (born December 3, 1958) is a private equity investor known for his leadership role in clean energy investment. He co-founded Hudson Clean Energy Partners, a global private equity firm that invests exclusively in clean energy, and co-founded the U.S. alternative energy investment business within the Special Situations Group at Goldman Sachs & Co.

Education and early career
Auerbach was born and raised in New York City. He began his education in the New York City public school system and then attended the State University of New York at Albany, where he earned a B.S. He went on to attend Boston University School of Law, where he earned a J.D., and New York University School of Law, where he earned an LL.M. in Taxation.

After working at several law firms in his early career, Auerbach was named Partner at McDermott, Will & Emery (1991-1992) and then served as Branch Chief, Assistant to the Associate Chief Counsel of the Internal Revenue Service (1992-1994). Auerbach launched his banking career at Morgan Stanley (1995-1997) as Principal (Co-Head) of a joint venture between the firm's Derivatives & Debt Capital Markets groups and went on to become managing director and Head of Structured Capital Markets at Barclays Capital (1997-1999).

Goldman Sachs
After working in the Debt Capital Markets and Credit Derivatives units at Goldman Sachs, Auerbach joined Goldman's Special Situations Group in December 2003. He began to focus on the renewable energy industry in the U.S. and went on to launch the alternative energy investment business within the Special Situations Group with a principal focus on wind and solar energy. During Auerbach's tenure in the Group, he invested over $1.5 billion of firm capital in wind energy, solar energy, and biofuel companies and established a track record of developing, closing, and funding unique structured financings. Auerbach led several of Goldman's most successful renewable energy investments, including Horizon Wind Energy, SunEdison, and First Solar.

Hudson Clean Energy
In 2007, Auerbach was joined by another Goldman colleague with whom he co-founded Hudson Clean Energy Partners, an independent private equity firm. Auerbach currently serves as Co-Managing Partner with John Cavalier, who joined Hudson as Co-Managing Partner in 2008 from Credit Suisse's Global Energy Group, where he was chairman.

Hudson has over $1 billion in assets and invests in sectors that include wind, solar, and hydroelectric energy, biofuels, biomass, smart grid, electric vehicles, energy efficiency, and storage. Hudson's inaugural fund, Hudson Clean Energy Partners, L.P., held a final close above its target in 2009 at $1.024 billion and was one of the few first-time funds to exceed its target amount, despite adverse global economic and market conditions due to the financial crisis. Since the fund's inception, Hudson sold its stake in Recurrent Energy to Sharp Corporation of Japan.

In 2011, Hudson Clean Energy Partners expanded into China, opening an office in Beijing and appointing Zhongmin Shen as Head of China Operations. As part of its expansion into China, Hudson announced plans to establish an RMB fund to invest in China's clean energy markets in partnership with The Yangzhou Municipal Government Financial Affairs Office. According to Hudson, the joint venture will enable substantial new investment in China, help harness the country's manufacturing prowess, and bring foreign technologies to China's domestic market. In 2012, Hudson Clean Energy Partners purchased a minority stake in GSE Investment Corporation (GSEI), a Chinese company operating in the waste-to-energy and wastewater treatment space.

Sunlight Financial
In 2014, Neil Auerbach - along with Wilson Chang - founded Sunlight Financial. Sunlight is one of the largest solar financiers in the United States, with over $3 billion in loans to date.

Policy Initiatives
As a former Commissioner of the National Commission on Energy Policy (Bipartisan Policy Center), Auerbach has advocated bipartisan support for U.S. clean energy legislation, developed in-depth policy recommendations, and participated in a commission consisting of a private, bipartisan, and diverse group of leading energy experts and stakeholders.

Auerbach was also an early supporter of the tax equity market as a significant driver of the expansion of U.S. renewable energy. He has stated that it has had a positive impact in the areas of utility‐scale wind power generation and commercial‐scale solar facilities.

In 2011, Auerbach testified in front of the U.S. Senate Committee on Energy and Natural Resources, the U.S. House Energy and Commerce Sub-Committee on Energy and Power, and the U.S. House Committee on Ways and Means, proposing a market-based approach for the federal government to encourage large-scale deployment of clean energy in the U.S. Auerbach has supported the development and implementation of reverse auctions as an innovative approach to support the continued growth of the renewable energy sector that has met success in other industries and recently in the renewable energy industry in Brazil, Argentina, Mexico, Peru, Honduras, Uruguay, China, Morocco, and Egypt.

Affiliations
Auerbach is a member of the Leadership Council, ACORE, and also serves on the executive committee of ACORE's Partnership for Renewable Energy Finance (US PREF). Auerbach is a member of the U.S. Council on Competitiveness, the Brookings China Center, and was formerly a Commissioner of the National Commission on Energy Policy.

Media Appearances
Auerbach has appeared in the media providing expert commentary on energy and investment issues. Below is a partial list in chronological order.
CNBC "Best Opportunities in Clean Energy" (April, 2012)
Bloomberg Radio "Neil Auerbach on The Hays Advantage with Kathleen Hays and Vonnie Quinn" (March, 2012)
Asian Venture Capital Journal "Hudson Clean Energy Makes China Debut" (March, 2012)
Reuters "Analysis: As solar panels eclipsed, installers in limelight" (February, 2012)
Reuters "PE Hudson eyes biggest China cleantech fund" (September, 2011)
National Journal "Escaping the Valley of Death" (June, 2011)
Bloomberg Radio "Neil Auerbach on The Hays Advantage with Kathleen Hays" (May, 2011)
MarketWatch "Green-energy gurus not holding breath on CO2 rules" (June, 2009)

References

1958 births
Living people
American investors